Tcholliré is a town and commune in Cameroon.

Tcholliré Prison
Designed in 1965, the main prison of Tcholliré II was known as the Centre de Rééducation Civique (CRC) (Civic re-education Centre) until the reform of the prison regime in Cameroon in 1992.  The sadly renowned former political prison has now become a "normal" prison. 

Today, 200 inmates live in this prison whose capacity has been increased to 500 places. 4 large buildings with a capacity of more than 100 places each serve as cells for the inmates of the main prison of Tcholliré II.

This prison has the peculiarity of only accommodating people who have been definitively sentenced. It houses exclusively men. There are no women's wings, let alone juvenile wings. The prison of Tcholliré II has today definitively turned the dark pages that haunted its premises.

History teaches us that the Civic Re-education Centre (CRC) of Tcholliré was the materialisation in practice of Ordinance n° 62/OF/18 of 12 March 1962 on the repression of subversion. This Ordinance, which is hardly mentioned in the history books of Cameroon's secondary and high schools, had considerable effects on the whole of public and political life for three decades, between 1962 and 1990. 

The key word of this law was "Subversion". According to this text was subversive whoever "emitted or propagated noises, news, rumours or accurate news, when such noises, news, rumours or comments are likely to harm public authorities". An imprecise definition gave rise to numerous abuses. Under this Ordinance, many Cameroonians from all walks of life have been arrested, tortured and detained for many years, sometimes without trial, in the difficult conditions of prisons in Yoko (Central Region), Mantoum (Western Region), Tcholliré (Northern Region). Among the victims of this Ordinance on the repression of subversion are a host of political figures. But one name will draw our attention: Mgr Albert NDONGMO, a man of the Catholic Church sentenced to death in 1971 for conspiracy, locked up for five years in the Civic Re-education Centre of Tcholliré. 

Since the advent of the return to a multi-party system and public liberties, the face of the Civic Re-education Centre of Tcholliré has changed. Its name has undergone a profound change.

PRISON WITH A HUMAN FACE

In accordance with article 5 of decree n° 92-052 of 27 March 1992 on the prison regime in Cameroon, the Cholliré II remand prison could have been a production prison. The geographical context in which this prison is located ideally allows convicts to participate through their work in the national development effort. It is located in a rural area where agricultural or breeding activities can be carried out.  Vast arable land is available to give a chance of rehabilitation to the inmates of this prison.  But the act establishing the Tcholliré II penitentiary makes it a main prison and not a specialised prison. 

For lack of having received the attributes of an agro-pastoral production penitentiary, the main prison of Tcholliré II remains a living environment where the prisoners all know each other by name. The atmosphere there is good-natured.

See also
Communes of Cameroon

References
 Site de la primature - Élections municipales 2002 
 Contrôle de gestion et performance des services publics communaux des villes camerounaises - Thèse de Donation Avele, Université Montesquieu Bordeaux IV 
 Charles Nanga, La réforme de l’administration territoriale au Cameroun à la lumière de la loi constitutionnelle n° 96/06 du 18 janvier 1996, Mémoire ENA. 

Populated places in North Region (Cameroon)
Communes of Cameroon